Thomas Stephen Foley (March 6, 1929 – October 18, 2013) was an American lawyer and politician who served as the 49th speaker of the United States House of Representatives from 1989 to 1995. A member of the Democratic Party, Foley represented Washington's fifth district for thirty years  He was the first Speaker of the House since Galusha Grow in 1862 to be defeated in a re-election campaign.

Born in Spokane, Washington, Foley attended Gonzaga University and pursued a legal career, after graduating from the University of Washington School of Law in Seattle. He joined the staff of Senator Henry M. Jackson, after working as a prosecutor and an assistant attorney general. With Jackson's support, Foley won election to the House of Representatives, defeating incumbent Republican Congressman Walt Horan. He served as Majority Whip from 1981 to 1987, and as Majority Leader from 1987 to 1989. After the resignation of Jim Wright, Foley became Speaker of the House.

Foley's district had become increasingly conservative during his tenure, but he won re-election throughout the 1980s and early 1990s. In the 1994 election, Foley faced attorney George Nethercutt. Nethercutt mobilized popular anger over Foley's opposition to term limits to defeat him. After leaving the House, Foley served as the United States Ambassador to Japan from 1997 to 2001 under President Bill Clinton.

Early life, education, and legal career
Born and raised in Spokane, Washington, Foley was the son of Helen Marie (née Higgins), a school teacher, and Ralph E. Foley  a Superior Court judge for 34 years. He was of Irish Catholic descent on both sides of his family; his grandfather Cornelius Foley was a maintenance foreman for the Great Northern railroad in 

Foley graduated from the Jesuit-run Gonzaga Preparatory School in Spokane in 1946 and attended Gonzaga University for three years; he completed his bachelor's degree at the University of Washington in Seattle, then attended its School of Law and was awarded a law degree in 1957.

Following law school, Foley entered private practice. In 1958, he began working in the Spokane County prosecutor's office as a deputy prosecuting attorney, and later taught at Gonzaga's School of Law (in Spokane) from 1958 to 1959. He joined the state attorney general's office in 1961 as an assistant attorney general.

In 1961, Foley moved to Washington, D.C., and joined the staff of Senator Henry M. Jackson. He left Jackson's office in 1964 to run for Congress.

Congressional service
In 1964, Foley was unopposed for the Democratic nomination for Washington's 5th congressional seat, which included Spokane. He faced 11-term Republican incumbent Walt Horan in the general election and won by seven points, one of many swept into office in the 1964 Democratic landslide. He was re-elected without significant difficulty until 1978, when in a 3-person race, he won only 48% of the vote. Two years later, he narrowly defeated Republican candidate John Sonneland (52% to 48%). Though the fifth district became increasingly conservative, Foley didn't face serious opposition again until his defeat in 1994. Foley voted in favor of the Voting Rights Act of 1965, the Civil Rights Act of 1968, the bill establishing Martin Luther King Jr. Day as a federal holiday, and the Civil Rights Restoration Act of 1987 (as well as to override President Reagan's veto).

During his first term in the House, Foley was appointed to the Agriculture Committee and the Interior and Insular Affairs Committee. He served on the latter committee through 1975, when he became chairman of the Agriculture Committee. In 1981, when Foley was appointed Majority Whip, he left the Agriculture Committee to serve on the House Administration Committee. Six years later, January 1987, he was elected House Majority Leader.

Speaker of the House
In June 1989, Jim Wright of Texas resigned as Speaker of the House of Representatives (only the fourth speaker ever to resign) and from Congress amid a House Ethics Committee investigation into his personal business dealings. In the June 6 election to succeed Wright, Foley was the victor, receiving 251 votes; his Republican opponent, Minority Leader Robert H. Michel, received 164 votes.

During the 101st Congress, Foley presided over the House as it passed a landmark update to the 1963 Clean Air Act, measures protecting persons with disabilities, the Americans with Disabilities Act and the Individuals with Disabilities Education Act, as well as the Budget Enforcement Act of 1990. The budget act, a part of the massive Omnibus Budget Reconciliation Act of 1990, established the "pay-as-you-go" process for discretionary spending and taxes, and was signed into law by President George H. W. Bush on November 5, 1990, contrary to his 1988 campaign promise not to raise taxes. This became a significant issue during the 1992 presidential campaign.

In 1993, the 103rd Congress passed an omnibus budget bill through which the government was able to raise additional revenue and balance the federal budget. Signed into law by President Bill Clinton signed on August 10, 1993, the measure stirred controversy because of the tax increases it imposed. Under Foley's leadership Congress also passed the Family and Medical Leave Act of 1993, the North American Free Trade Agreement Implementation Act, as well as the Brady Handgun Violence Prevention Act plus legislation that laid the groundwork for the "Don't ask, don't tell" military service policy in 1993 which was then instituted by the Clinton Administration in 1994.

As of 2023, he is the most recent Democrat other than Nancy Pelosi to serve as Speaker of the House.

Term limits
During his time in the House, Foley repeatedly opposed efforts to impose term limits on Washington state's elected officials, winning the support of the state's voters to reject term limits in a 1991 referendum; however, in 1992, a term limit ballot initiative was approved by the state's voters.

Foley brought suit, challenging the constitutionality of a state law setting eligibility requirements on federal offices. Foley won his suit, with a United States District Court declaring that states did not have the authority under the United States Constitution to limit the terms of federal officeholders.

However, in Foley's bid for a 16th term in the House, his Republican opponent, George Nethercutt, used the issue against him, citing the caption of the federal case brought by Foley, "Foley against the People of the State of Washington". Nethercutt vowed that if elected, he would not serve more than three terms in the House, though he ultimately served for five. Foley lost in a narrow race. While Foley had usually relied on large margins in Spokane to carry him to victory, in 1994 he won Spokane by only 9,000 votes, while Nethercutt did well enough in the rest of the district to win overall by just under 4,000 votes. Since Foley left office, no Democrat has garnered more than 45 percent of the district's vote.

Foley became the first incumbent Speaker of the House to lose his bid for re-election since Galusha A. Grow in 1862. He is sometimes viewed as a political casualty of the term limits controversy of the early 1990s. President Clinton attributed Foley's defeat to his support for the Federal Assault Weapons Ban of 1994.

Later career
From 1995 to 1998, Foley was head of the Federal City Council, a group of business, civic, education, and other leaders interested in economic development in Washington, D.C.

In 1997, Foley was appointed as the 25th U.S. Ambassador to Japan by President Bill Clinton, and was part of the US government response to the deaths of Japanese schoolchildren caused by a US submarine. 
He served as ambassador until 2001.

Foley was a Washington delegate to the 2004 and 2012 Democratic National Conventions.  On July 9, 2003, Governor Gary Locke awarded the Washington Medal of Merit, the state's highest honor, to Foley.  He was North American Chairman of the Trilateral Commission.

Death
Foley died at his home in Washington, D.C. on October 18, 2013, following months of hospice care after suffering a series of strokes and a bout with pneumonia. He was 84 and was survived by his wife, Heather. Services were held at St. Aloysius Church at Gonzaga University, as well as in Washington, D.C. Speaker John Boehner, and Nancy Pelosi, who had also served as Speaker, issued statements honoring Foley. In a White House statement, President Barack Obama called Foley a "legend of the United States Congress" who "represented the people of Washington's 5th district with skill, dedication, and a deep commitment to improving the lives of those he was elected to serve.", going on to praise Foley for his bipartisanship and subsequent ambassadorial service under former President Clinton. Vice President Joe Biden also released an official statement, saying "Tom was a good friend and a dedicated public servant.", citing his work in Congress with Foley in the 1980s on budgetary issues. Washington Governor Jay Inslee also released a statement, acknowledging Foley's efforts to reach consensus and emphasize mutual common ground, and his work in the legal system and in Congress. Former President George H. W. Bush stated that Foley "represented the very best in public service--and our political system" and "never got personal or burned bridges."

Honors
 Honorary Knight Commander of the Order of the British Empire (UK).
 Order of Merit (Germany).
 Légion d'honneur (France).
 Order of the Rising Sun with Paulownia Flowers, Grand Cordon (Japan), 1995.
 Thomas S. Foley Institute for Public Policy and Public Service at Washington State University, Pullman. Established in 1995.
 Thomas S. Foley Memorial Highway (U.S. Route 395), dedicated in 2018.

Electoral history

Congressional elections
 November 3, 1964:

 November 8, 1966:

 November 5, 1968:

 November 3, 1970:

 November 7, 1972:

 November 5, 1974:

 November 2, 1976:

 November 7, 1978:

 November 4, 1980:

 November 2, 1982:

 November 6, 1984:

 November 4, 1986:

 November 8, 1988:

 November 6, 1990:

 November 3, 1992:

 November 8, 1994:

Speaker elections
 June 6, 1989:
{| class=wikitable
|-
! colspan=5 style="background:#f5f5f5" | 1989 intra-term Speaker of the House election101st Congress
|-
! colspan=2 |  Party
! Candidate
! Votes
! Percent
|-
| style="background-color: " |
| style="width: 7em;" | Democratic
| style="width: 18em;" | Tom Foley (Washington)
| style="text-align:right" | 251
| style="text-align:right" | 60.19%
|-
| style="background-color: " |
| Republican
| Robert H. Michel (Illinois)
| style="text-align:right" | 164
| style="text-align:right" | 39.33%
|-
| colspan=3 | Answered "present"
| style="text-align:right" | 2
| style="text-align:right" | 0.48%
|-
! colspan=3 style="text-align:right" | Total votes:
! style="text-align:right" | 417
! style="text-align:right" | 100%
|}
 January 3, 1991:
{|class="wikitable"
|-
! colspan=5 style="background:#f5f5f5" | 1991 Speaker of the House election102nd Congress
|-
! colspan=2 | Party
! Candidate
! Votes
! Percent
|-
| style="background-color: " |
| style="width: 7em;" | Democratic
| style="width: 18em;" | Tom Foley (Washington)
| style="text-align:right" | 262
| style="text-align:right" | 61.07%
|-
| style="background-color: " |
| Republican
| Robert H. Michel (Illinois)
| style="text-align:right" | 165
| style="text-align:right" | 38.47%
|-
| colspan=3 | Answered "present"
| style="text-align:right" | 2
| style="text-align:right" | 0.46%
|-
! colspan=3 style="text-align:right" | Total votes:
! style="text-align:right" | 429
! style="text-align:right" | 100%
|}
 January 5, 1993:
{|class="wikitable"
|-
! colspan=5 style="background:#f5f5f5" | 1993 Speaker of the House election103rd Congress
|-
! colspan=2 | Party
! Candidate
! Votes
! Percent
|-
| style="background-color: " |
| style="width: 7em;" | Democratic
| style="width: 18em;" | Tom Foley (Washington)
| style="text-align:right" | 255
| style="text-align:right" | 59.16%
|-
| style="background-color: " |
| Republican
| Robert H. Michel (Illinois)
| style="text-align:right" | 174
| style="text-align:right" | 40.38%
|-
| colspan=3 | Answered "present"
| style="text-align:right" | 2
| style="text-align:right" | 0.46%
|-
! colspan=3 style="text-align:right" | Total votes:
! style="text-align:right" | 431
! style="text-align:right" | 100%
|}

References

External links
 
 

|-

|-

|-

|-

|-

|-

|-

|-

1929 births
2013 deaths
20th-century American diplomats
20th-century American lawyers
20th-century American politicians
21st-century American diplomats
Ambassadors of the United States to Japan
American people of Irish descent
American prosecutors
Commanders Crosses of the Order of Merit of the Federal Republic of Germany
Deaths from pneumonia in Washington, D.C.
Democratic Party members of the United States House of Representatives from Washington (state)
Gonzaga Preparatory School alumni
Gonzaga University alumni
Gonzaga University faculty
Honorary Knights Commander of the Order of the British Empire
Lawyers from Spokane, Washington
Majority leaders of the United States House of Representatives
Politicians from Spokane, Washington
Recipients of the Legion of Honour
Recipients of the Order of the Rising Sun with Paulownia Flowers
Speakers of the United States House of Representatives
State attorneys
University of Washington School of Law alumni
Washington (state) lawyers
Politicians awarded knighthoods